North-West Europe campaign of 1940 is a battle honour given to several regiments in the British Army. It refers to the land campaign starting with the invasion of France in May 1940, and ending with the evacuation of the British Expeditionary Force from Dunkirk and other ports.

List of units

The following units were awarded the battle honour,

 East Lancashire Regiment
 South Lancashire Regiment
 The Loyal Regiment (North Lancashire)
Duke of Wellington's Regiment
 Grenadier Guards
 South Staffordshire Regiment
 Gloucestershire Regiment
 Coldstream Guards
 West Yorkshire Regiment
 1st The Queen's Dragoon Guards
 Royal Dragoon Guards

See also
North-West Europe 1942 (Battle honour)
North-West Europe campaign of 1944–45

References

Battle honours of the British Army